Pseudoplatystoma corruscans, the spotted sorubim, is a species of long-whiskered catfish native to the São Francisco and Paraná—Paraguay River basins in South America.  This species grows to a length of  TL.

References
 

Pimelodidae
Fish of the São Francisco River basin
Fish described in 1829